The House of Seven Corpses is a 1973 American horror film directed by Paul Harrison and starring John Ireland, Faith Domergue and John Carradine.

Plot
Film director Eric Hartman  is making a horror film about the Beal house, a mansion in which numerous members of the family all met violent deaths, ranging from accident to suicide and murder. Eric decides to film the movie in the actual Beal house. In the midst of shooting a scene, aging actress Gayle Dorian, who is playing Maria Beal, reads from The Book of the Dead and chants: “Exsurgent mortui et ad me veniunt” (“may the dead rise and come to me”). Edgar Price, the caretaker of the home, interrupts the filming of the scene by remarking that it is historically inaccurate.

Edgar takes the cast and crew on a tour of the house, showing them the sites of various deaths before bringing them to the rooms they will be staying in on the top floor of the mansion. Anne, another actress in the film, finds several books on the occult in a bedroom. Later that night, Anne witnesses Edgar climbing into a coffin in the graveyard behind the home from her bedroom window, and informs her boyfriend, a crewmember named David, that she is frightened of the house. Meanwhile, Gayle's pet cat, Cleon, escapes her room, leading her downstairs, where her drunken co-star, Christopher, forces himself on her. After Gayle forces Christopher off of her, Eric stumbles on the scene and breaks up the fight. Afterward, Anne and David inform Eric about their witnessing Edgar in the graveyard. Eric tells them he filmed some footage of Edgar in the cemetery for the film, but appears perturbed when they tell him they watched Edgar climb into a coffin.

The next day, while filming a scene outside, Gayle shrieks upon seeing her dead cat lying in the grass. Eric suspects that Edgar killed the cat. When he goes to visit Edgar at his living quarters, he finds a gun in a locked drawer, which he steals. Edgar vehemently denies killing the cat. When Eric leaves, Edgar returns to etching "Cleon" on a headstone. Gayle threatens to quit the film, but Eric persuades her to stay.

On the last day of the shoot, David reads from the Book of the Dead, repeating a chant summoning the dead to come to him; simultaneously, Gayle reads from the book as well during the filming of a scene in which her character, Maria, is resurrecting her lover's dead body. Meanwhile, Edgar hears noises coming from the cemetery, and goes to inspect. He is confronted by a zombie that emerges from a grave, which strangles him. After filming completes, Eric congratulates the cast before they retire to their rooms. Shortly after, the zombie arrives at the house, killing three crew members—Ron, Danny, and Tom—as they tear down equipment. Gayle subsequently witnesses the zombie climbing the staircase, and frantically obtains Edgar's gun from Eric's bedroom. A frightened Gayle inadvertently shoots Christopher to death, mistaking him for the zombie. Anne hears the gunshot, and upon going to investigate, finds Gayle's corpse hanging from a rope; horrified, Anne faints.

Meanwhile, when Eric and David go to film pick-ups in the cemetery, they find Edgar's dead body near an empty grave. David suddenly attacks Eric, but falls into the grave during the tussle. Beneath a thin layer of dirt, Eric spots the grave marking, and upon rubbing it away, finds that it reads "David Beal: 1847–1896." David proceeds to reemerge from the grave as a zombie, causing Eric to flee back to the house, where he finds the bodies of the three dead crew members along with those of Gayle, Christopher, and Anne. Eric grows hysterical when he observes his spools of film destroyed on the floor. Moments later, the zombie throws a film camera from the top stair landing onto Eric's head, killing him. The zombie then carries Anne's corpse back to the cemetery and disappears into the grave with it.

Cast

Production
It was filmed at the Utah Governor's Mansion in Salt Lake City.

Release
The House of Seven Corpses was released theatrically in Charlotte, North Carolina on December 12, 1973.

Critical response
Writing in The Zombie Movie Encyclopedia, academic Peter Dendle called the film "routine but capably handled".  Writing in Zombie Movies: The Ultimate Guide, Glenn Kay called the concept better suited to an anthology film. Bloody Disgusting rated it 1.5/5 stars and wrote that though it is "only frightening in the first few minutes".  Stuart Galbraith of DVD Talk rated it 2/5 stars and called it "cheap and derivative but hard to entirely dislike".  Daryl Loomis of DVD Verdict wrote, "While there are things to enjoy about The House of Seven Corpses, it is completely forgettable, mostly because it's patently unscary."

Home media
Severin Films released the film on DVD and Blu-ray in 2013.

Notes

References

Sources

External links

1973 films
1973 directorial debut films
1973 horror films
1973 independent films
1970s American films
1970s English-language films
1970s supernatural horror films
American haunted house films
American independent films
American supernatural horror films
American zombie films
Films about filmmaking
Films set in country houses
Films shot in Salt Lake City